Vasanthi is a 1988 Indian Tamil-language film, directed by Chitralaya Gopu. The film stars Mohan, Madhuri, Devilalitha, Manorama, S. S. Chandran, Vinu Chakravarthy and Loose Mohan. The film's music was composed by Chandrabose. It is a remake of the 1955 Telugu film Donga Ramudu.

Cast 
Mohan
Madhuri
Devilalitha
Manorama
S. S. Chandran
Vinu Chakravarthy
Loose Mohan
Meena

Production 
The filming was completed in 30 days.

Soundtrack 
Soundtrack was composed by Chandrabose and lyrics were penned by Vairamuthu.

Critical reception 
Vasanthi was released on 2 December 1988. The Indian Express wrote, "Chitralaya Gopu [..] directs the film interspersing seriousness with humour".

References

External links 

1980s Tamil-language films
1988 drama films
1988 films
AVM Productions films
Films directed by Chitralaya Gopu
Films scored by Chandrabose (composer)
Indian drama films
Tamil remakes of Telugu films